Albert Russell, KC (1884 – 12 May 1975) was a Scottish Unionist Party politician and advocate.

Russell was educated at Glasgow Academy and the University of Glasgow.

He was elected Member of Parliament for Kirkcaldy Burghs in 1931 but lost his seat to Labour in 1935. He served as Solicitor General for Scotland from 29 November 1935 to 25 June 1936. From 1936 to 1960 he served as a Lord of Session, gaining the judicial title Lord Russell.

Sources 

https://web.archive.org/web/20170203065452/http://www.leighrayment.com/misc/lordofsessions.htm

References

External links 
 

1884 births
1975 deaths
Members of the Faculty of Advocates
Alumni of the University of Glasgow
People educated at the Glasgow Academy
Members of the Parliament of the United Kingdom for Fife constituencies
Unionist Party (Scotland) MPs
UK MPs 1931–1935
Solicitors General for Scotland
Place of birth missing
Russell